H.G. Yakob Mar Elias is the current Metropolitan of the Brahmavar Diocese of Malankara Orthodox Syrian Church. His Grace was born on 24-02-1953 as the son of Chackaleth Viruthiyath Kizhakkethil Mathai and Mariamma

Early life 
After taking his Masters Degree from Kerala University, he joined the Orthodox Theological Seminary, Kottayam, for theological studies. From the Orthodox Theological Seminary, Kottayam, he took Graduate Degree in Sacred Theology (GST) and the Bachelor of Divinity (BD) degree at the Senate of Serampore University.

Ministry 
His Grace took several key positions of the church Position held – Manager, Mar Elia Chapel, Sasthamkotta, Director, St. Basil Bible School, Vice President, Orthodox Christian Youth Movement, Secretary, Kottayam Diocese, Member, Ecumenical Relations Committee.Member, Mission Tranining Centre, Member, Mavelikkara, Orthodox Bible Preparation Committee, Member, Malankara Sabha Editorial Board, Member, Oriental and Anglican Forum.

He is elected as the  Metropolitan candidate on 17th February at the Malankara Association held at Sasthamkotta. He is consecrated as Metropolitan on  12th May 2010 at Mar Elia Cathedral, Kottayam. His Grace  is serving the Brahmavar Diocese as its Metropolitan.

His Grace was appointed as the Metropolitan of the Brahmavar Diocese with it’s head quarters at Mangalore, by His Holiness Baselios Marthoma Didymus I through the Kalpana No.396/2010 dated 4-8-2010.

The Brahmavar Diocese  
As the current Metropolitan of the Brahmavar Diocese, His Grace holds the responsibility of the following churches: 

01. St. George Orthodox Cathedral, Abu Dhabi

02. Arangu St. George

03. Ariprod St.Thomas

04. Aravanchal St. George

05. Birikkulam St.Gregorios

06. Brahmavar St. Mary's Cathedral

07. Eattukudakka St.Mary’s

08. Hegla Mar Gregorios

09. Ichilampady St.George

10. Kadumeni St.George

11. Kalanja St. Marys

12. Karayathumchal St.Mary’s

13. Karuvamkayam Mar Gregorios

14. Karugunda St. George

15. Mangalore St. Gregorios

16. Nelliadi St. Gregorios

17. Padangady St. Mary's

18. Pathavu St. George

19. Renjilady St. Thomas

20. Kasargode St.Mary’s

21. Kozhichal St.Mary’s

22. Mardalam St.Mary’s

23. Narasiharajapuram St.Mary’s

24. Narkilakadu St.Mary’s

25. Pakkanjikadu St.George

26. Panaji St.Mary’s

27. Payyavor St. Gregorios

28. Sampiadi St.Mary’s

29. Siddhapura St.Mary’s

30. Thannir Panthal St.George

31. Vanchiyam St.George

32. Vasco-Da-Gama St.Mary’s

33. Chuzhali St. George

34. Manipal St. Thomas

35. Ganganadu St. Gregorios

36. Shivmogga St. George

Present Life 
His Grace currently resides at  Mount Horeb Bishop's House, Balikashram Road, Kankanady, Mangalore. He constantly visits the churches in the Brahmavar Diocese for special occasions.

References

1953 births
Living people
Malankara Orthodox Syrian Church bishops